Turn It Up may refer to:

Film and television
 Turn It Up (film), a 2000 drama/musical movie
 Turn It Up!, an American television game show
 Turn It Up! (Australian TV series), a 1990s Australian music television show

Music

Albums
 Turn It Up (Pixie Lott album), or the title song (see below)
 Turn It Up (Rare Essence album)
 Turn It Up (Shannon Noll album)
 Turn It Up (Josh Thompson album), or the title song
 Turn It Up (Treacherous Three album), or the title song
 Turn It Up! The Very Best of Busta Rhymes, or the title song (see below)
 Turn It Up, by IG Culture (recording as NSM)
 Austin & Ally: Turn It Up, 2013

Songs
 "Turn It Up" (Brandy song)
 "Turn It Up" (Chamillionaire song)
 "Turn It Up" (The Feeling song)
 "Turn It Up" (Johntá Austin song)
 "Turn It Up" (Paris Hilton song)
 "Turn It Up" (Peter Andre song)
 "Turn It Up" (Pixie Lott song)
 "Turn It Up" (Sean Paul song)
 "Turn It Up" (Texas Hippie Coalition song)
 "Turn It Up" (T.O.P song)
 "Turn It Up" (Ultra Naté song)
 "Turn It Up" (Wanessa Camargo song)
 "Turn It Up (R.O.N.N. & CeCe Peniston song)", a song by Ron Carroll and CeCe Peniston, originally titled "In Love with a DJ"
 "Turn It Up", by A from How Ace Are Buildings
 "Turn It Up", by Alan Parsons from Try Anything Once
 "Turn It Up", by Alesha Dixon from Fired Up
 "Turn It Up", by The Bamboos
 "Turn It Up", by Blur from Modern Life Is Rubbish
 "Turn It Up", by Bomfunk MC's from Reverse Psychology
 "Turn It Up", by Busta Rhymes from When Disaster Strikes, remixed as "Turn It Up (Remix)/Fire It Up"
 "Turn It Up", by Ciara from Basic Instinct
 "Turn It Up", by Grum
 "Turn It Up", by Kyle
 "Turn It Up", by Masta Ace Incorporated from Sittin' on Chrome
 "Turn It Up", by Mishon Ratliff
 "Turn It Up", by Ricki-Lee Coulter from Ricki-Lee
 "Turn It Up", by Robots in Disguise from Get RID!
 "Turn It Up!", by Sonic Syndicate from We Rule the Night
 "Turn It Up", by Stereos from Stereos
 "Turn It Up", by Technotronic
 "Turn It Up", by Ted Nugent from Free-for-All